PTAS or Ptas may refer to:
Polynomial-time approximation scheme, an approximation algorithm in computer science
Pesetas, Spanish currency
PTAS reduction, an approximation-preserving reduction in computational complexity theory
Preferential trading area, another term for a trade bloc